The Asian U18 Athletics Championships (formerly Asian Youth Athletics Championships) is a biennial, continental athletics competition for Asian athletes, organised by the Asian Athletics Association. First held in 2015, it a youth category event open to athletes aged fifteen and seventeen. The competition was the fourth continental athletics competition to be held for that age level, following in the steps of the South American, Oceanian and African events. Its first edition came at a time of rising interest in such competitions, with the first African championships being held in 2013, and the European Athletics Youth Championships scheduled for the following year. In March 2014, the Asian Athletics Association's president Dahlan Jumaan al-Hamad cited the creation of the championships as a way of boosting the grassroots-level development of the sport in Asia and raise the importance of continental level competition among the region's countries.

Editions

Championships records

Boys

Girls

Medals (2015-2022)

See also
 Asian Junior Athletics Championships
 Asian Athletics Championships

References

External links 
 Asian Athletics Association website



 
Continental athletics championships
Youth
Under-18 athletics competitions
Youth Athletics
Biennial athletics competitions